The Panalatinga Creek is an urban watercourse located in the southern suburbs of Adelaide in the Australian state of South Australia.

Course and features
Part of the Onkaparinga River catchment area that drains the western slopes of the Mount Lofty Ranges, the creek rises in the foothills in the southern Adelaide suburbs around Chandlers Hill through to Trott Park, South Australia and reaches its confluence with the Field River near the Southern Expressway. Now no more than a narrow suburban watercourse, Panalatinga Creek's earliest European recorded use was as the source of water for John Reynell's early vineyards around his Chateau Reynella homestead in 1849.

Etymology
The name of the creek is derived from the Kaurna language word of Pandlotinga, and is sometimes mispronounced as Panatalinga.

See also

Panalatinga Road

References

Rivers of Adelaide